The fête nationale (English: National Day or National Celebration) is a holiday in many places, frequently as a public holiday. It is a French language term for National Holiday, so is used in places that use French.

It may refer to:
 Bastille Day (July 14) in France, Fête nationale française
 Grand Duke's Official Birthday (June 23) in Luxembourg, Fête nationale luxembourgeoise
 Saint-Jean-Baptiste Day  (June 24) in Quebec, Fête nationale du Québec
Madagascar National Day (June 26) in Madagascar, Fête nationale Malagasy
 Canada Day (July 1) in Canada, Fête du Canada and Fête nationale du Canada
 Belgian National Day (July 21) in Belgium, Fête nationale belge
 Swiss National Day (August 1) in Switzerland, Fête nationale suisse

National holidays